Capital City Authority may refer to:
Kampala Capital City Authority, a government agency in Uganda
Nusantara Capital City Authority, a government agency in Indonesia
National Capital Authority, a government agency in Australia